Ernst Julius Berg (9 Feb. 1871 - 1941) was a Swedish-born, American electrical engineer.

Biography
Ernst Julius Berg was born in Östersund, Jämtland County in Sweden. After graduating from the Royal Institute of Technology in Stockholm in 1892, he immigrated to the United States. He began working as an assistant to Charles Proteus Steinmetz at General Electric. He then joined the faculty of electrical engineering at Union College.

In 1909, he became head of electrical engineering department at the University of Illinois. Berg remained as department head until June 1913, when he resigned and returned to his former positions with General Electric Company and with Union College. He was associated with Union College until his death in 1941.   A pioneer of radio, he produced the first two-way radio voice program in the United States. In the field of theoretical analysis of electrical circuits, he popularized Oliver Heaviside's technique of operational calculus.

In 1906 he married Gwendoline O'Brien.  He is buried in Vale Cemetery in Schenectady, New York.

Works
 1900: (with Charles Proteus Steinmetz) Theory and calculations of Alternating Current Phenomena, Electrical World and Engineer
 1908: Electrical energy, its generation, transmission, and utilization, McGraw Hill
 1916: Electrical Engineering, first course, McGraw Hill
 1916: Electrical Engineering, advanced course, McGraw Hill
 1929: Heaviside's Operational Calculus as Applied to Engineering and Physics, McGraw Hill via Internet Archive

Archive
Special Collections, Schaffer Library, Union College, Schenectady, New York.
University of Illinois Picture of EJ Berg

References
 S. Hensel (1994) Ernst Julius Berg Educator and Proselytizer of Heaviside's Calculus, IEEE Potentials, 13, 57.
 R.R. Kline (1988)  The General Electric professorship at Union College, 1903-41, IEEE Transactions on Education 31, 141.
 Benson, Adolph B. & Naboth Hedin (1969) Swedes In America, New York: Haskel House Publishers

External links
 

1871 births
1941 deaths
People from Östersund
Swedish emigrants to the United States
American electrical engineers
KTH Royal Institute of Technology alumni
University of Illinois Urbana-Champaign faculty
Union College (New York) faculty